The Central Rural Work Leading Group is a coordination body set up under the Central Committee of the Chinese Communist Party for the purpose of managing rural affairs.

References 
Institutions of the Central Committee of the Chinese Communist Party
Leading groups of the Chinese Communist Party
1993 establishments in China